Title Fight was an American rock band from Kingston, Pennsylvania, formed in 2003. They released 3 studio albums – Shed (2011), Floral Green (2012) and Hyperview (2015) – gradually shifting from a hardcore punk-oriented sound towards an emphasis on mellow atmospheres. Hyperview was released through ANTI-, a record label to which the band signed in July 2014.

History

Early years
Title Fight formed in 2003 as a three-piece band consisting of Jamie Rhoden on guitar and vocals, Ned Russin on bass and Ned's twin brother Ben on drums, playing local shows in Kingston and Wilkes-Barre, PA. Ned Russin claims his older brother, Alex Russin is a huge influence in their formation of Title Fight. Their name came from the cover of an old HBO showtime guide that Ned had read in the attic when he was younger. In addition to popular punk bands, Rhoden claims the Positive Numbers Fest (an annual hardcore/punk music festival in Wilkes-Barre, PA) was an influence on the band's formation. The band produced a demo entitled "Down for the Count" in 2003 that is still available on the internet.

In 2005, the band added Shane Moran on second guitar and recorded two demos in 2005 and 2006, during which they played shows in what they call a "small, tight-knit community" around Kingston, PA. These included several shows at the Doylestown, PA YMCA Teen Center.

Progression
They recorded a split with the Erection Kids in 2007 on FlightPlan Records. Members of the Erection Kids later went on to form Balance And Composure. The band quickly followed up their first release with the Kingston 7" (also on FlightPlan Records) in February 2008. Title Fight played with Fireworks on their tour with Set Your Goals Summer of 2007, ultimately leading to Jeff's (owner of Run For Cover Records) discovery of Title Fight. On October 16, 2008, it was announced that the band had signed to Run for Cover Records. The Last Thing You Forget 7" was recorded in December 2008 at the Getaway Group in Massachusetts with Jay Maas and released in June 2009 on Run for Cover Records.  The 7" featured three new songs while the CD release featured all of their releases to date. The artwork for the album was done by John Slaby, a friend from Wilkes-Barre. Later in June, the band went on tour with Crime in Stereo and Fireworks. This was followed by a US tour with New Found Glory. The Kingston EP has also been re-released on Six Feet Under Records with Dave Sausage in order to revamp the EP.  During these years, Title Fight altered their sounds to a more Melodic hardcore genre, with influences including Knapsack, Jawbreaker, and the Promise Ring.

In 2010, Title Fight was featured on Triple B Record's compilation, America's Hardcore, with a new song entitled "Dreamcatchers". They also did a US tour with Bayside, Senses Fail and Balance And Composure and a tour of Japan with H2O.

SideOneDummy Records

On January 19, 2011, Title Fight signed to SideOneDummy Records and announced they had finished recording their debut full-length, produced by Walter Schreifels (Gorilla Biscuits, Quicksand, and Rival Schools)  and engineered by Will Yip at Studio 4 in Conshohocken, PA. The band will also embark on their first headline tour in 2011 with the Menzingers, Touche Amore, Dead End Path and Shook Ones.

The band released their new album, Shed, on May 3, 2011. On February 10, they released a new song off Shed for free download entitled 27 and Shed's album artwork. On February 23, SideOneDummy posted pre-orders for a new Title Fight 7" called "Flood of '72". The 7" featured the song from Shed along with an acoustic version of the song, and was released on April 12.

On May 20, 2011 it was announced that Title Fight would play their first Australian tour with Touché Amoré in September 2011.

After finishing the AP Fall Tour 2011, Title Fight embarked on a 22 date European tour, starting November 28, 2011, visiting France, the Netherlands, Switzerland, Italy, Austria, Czech Republic, Germany, Belgium, the UK and finishing in Ireland with a final show in Dublin. They were joined by Balance And Composure and Transit for the tour.

On August 24 and 26, 2011, the band played both dates of Reading and Leeds festival in the UK.

Title Fight supported Rise Against on the second leg of their 2012 US Endgame Tour.

On January 11, 2012, through the Vans Warped Tour website, it was announced that Title Fight would be joining the 2012 tour on the Monster Energy stage.

On June 17, 2012, and July 8, 2012, Title Fight played Main Stage at the Vans Warped Tour.

Floral Green and Spring Songs (2012-2014)
Title Fight announced via tumblr that their next release Floral Green would come out on September 18, 2012. July 24th, 2012 Title Fight released a single "Head in the Ceiling Fan"  for free download on tumblr. On August 14, 2012 the band premiered another song "Sympathy", on NPR music. On September 13, 2012 SPIN magazine premiered a full stream of the record on their website. Floral Green debuted at #69 on the Billboard Top 200.  On October 19, 2012, Title Fight hosted a record release show in Warrior Run, Pennsylvania along with the Menzingers, Tigers Jaw, Gypsy, and Grey Zine prior to headlining a US tour with supporting acts Tigers Jaw, Pianos Become the Teeth, Whirr, Young Beats and Single Mothers.
  
Title Fight released the four-song EP Spring Songs on November 12, 2013 through Revelation Records, with its second track "Be A Toy" premiering on August 12 through SPIN magazine. The music video for "Be A Toy" was released on November 20, 2013, and was filmed on Super 8 during the bands' 2013 Spring European Tour, directed by Susy Cereijo.

ANTI- Records and Hyperview (2014-present)
In July 2014, the band announced on their Instagram account that they had signed to ANTI- Records, and were in the process of recording a new album with producer Will Yip. On December 1, the band announced their new album would be called Hyperview, set for a February 3, 2015 release date, and released a video for the track "Chlorine" through The FADER.

Aside from a few select appearances, the band has been primarily inactive since 2016.

Musical style
Title Fight's style has been described as post-hardcore, hardcore punk, melodic hardcore, punk rock, emo, shoegaze, and post-rock. Forming as a hardcore band, they soon began to draw influences from a variety of other genres such as alternative rock, shoegaze, and post-rock.

Other projects
The members of Title Fight are also known for their presence in many other Wilkes-Barre hardcore bands, most notably Bad Seed, which featured Shane on vocals and Jamie on bass. Ned joined the band later on bass while Jamie switched to guitar. Bad Seed released a demo in 2008 and a self-titled EP in 2009 on 6131 Records and played Sound and Fury and This is Hardcore Fest before disbanding in 2010. Along with Bad Seed, Shane, Ned and Ben played in the straight edge band, Disengage, who released a 7-song EP, Look Back, in 2010 Full-Length, Expressions, in 2011, and a self titled EP in 2014. Ned also plays in straight edge Wilkes-Barre band Stick Together, hardcore band Big Contest, and shoegaze indie-rock act Noise Pet. Jamie also plays in a shoegaze punk band by the name of Haze who released a demo of rough mixes in 2014. Ned and Ben are the younger brothers of Alex Russin, guitarist/singer of Gypsy and hardcore band Cold World.

In September 2010, the local venue, Cafe Metropolis in Wilkes-Barre, PA, where Title Fight played their first show, closed. To give back to the rising hardcore community, Title Fight and other local friends took action by opening Redwood Art Space, a venue in Wilkes-Barre. The venue opened in March 2011. However, in June 2012 the venue was forced into moving. They will be raising money to have a new venue, due open later this year. Bands such as Touché Amoré, Anti-Flag, and Bane have played shows there.

Most recently, Ned Russin started a solo project called Glitterer, based in New York City.

Members
 Jamie Rhoden – guitar, vocals (2003–present)
 Ned Russin – bass, vocals (2003–present)
 Shane Moran – guitar (2005–present)
 Ben Russin – drums (2003–present)

Discography
Studio albums
 Shed (2011, SideOneDummy)
 Floral Green (2012, SideOneDummy)
 Hyperview (2015, ANTI-)

Compilation albums
 The Last Thing You Forget (2009, Run For Cover)

Singles, EPs and splits
 Down for the Count (2003, self-released)
 Erection Kids / Title Fight (2007, Flight Plan)
 Kingston (2007, Six Feet Under)
 Live on WERS (2009, Run For Cover)
 Shed (2011, SideOneDummy)
 Missed (2011, SideOneDummy)
 Flood Of '72 (2011, SideOneDummy)	
 Secret Society (2012, SideOneDummy)
 Sympathy (2012, SideOneDummy)
 Spring Songs  (2013, Revelation)
 Touché Amoré / Title Fight (2013, Sea Legs)

Music videos

References

External links
 Official Tumblr
 Official MySpace

Hardcore punk groups from Pennsylvania
Alternative rock groups from Pennsylvania
Indie rock musical groups from Pennsylvania
American post-hardcore musical groups
American emo musical groups
Emo revival groups
American shoegaze musical groups
American post-rock groups
Melodic hardcore groups
2003 establishments in Pennsylvania
Musical groups established in 2003
Musical groups from Pennsylvania
People from Luzerne County, Pennsylvania
Musical quartets
Run for Cover Records artists
Anti- (record label) artists